Oak Knoll Wildlife Sanctuary at  1417 Park Street in Attleboro, Massachusetts is a wildlife sanctuary of the Massachusetts Audubon Society.  

The Sanctuary has preserved 75 acres on Lake Talaquega. The property contains a colonial house dating from 1759, which now serves as a nature center containing "[n]ative turtle species, invertebrates, and other exhibits." The land was formerly home to a  casino and hotel. The Sanctuary has "wooded trails and boardwalk winding through a red maple swamp, upland forest, and freshwater marsh, and around the lake’s perimeter."

References

External links
Official Website

Attleboro, Massachusetts
Massachusetts Audubon Society 
Nature centers in Massachusetts